The Gabriel Awards are a Catholic honor awarded each year for excellence in broadcasting. They were started by the Catholic Academy for Communication Arts Professionals in 1965, and are currently administered by the Catholic Media Association.

Description 

Awards are given to national and local market radio and television broadcasters to "recognize outstanding artistic achievement ... which entertains and enriches with a true vision of humanity ..."

In 2014, for example, television station WRAL in Raleigh, North Carolina, was recognized by the Gabriel Awards for its news division's production of programs dealing with childhood homelessness and conditions in Haiti.

References

External links 
 Official website

Awards established in 1965
American television awards
Radio awards